Teodross Avery (born July 2, 1973) is an American jazz tenor saxophonist, who has released albums for the record labels including GRP Records and Impulse! Records.

A native of the San Francisco Bay Area, his 2019 album, After the Rain: A Night for Coltrane, was released on Tompkins Square Records in May that year. Harlem Stories: The Music of Thelonious Monk followed in September 2020.

Discography

Albums
 In Other Words (GRP Records, 1994)
 My Generation (Impulse!, 1996)
 New Day New Groove (5th Power Records, 2001)
 Diva's Choice (CD Baby, 2009)
 Bridging the Gap: Hip Hop Jazz (BTG Music, 2011)
 Post Modern Trap Music (Katalyst Entertainment, 2017)
 After The Rain: A Night For Coltrane (Tompkins Square, 2019)
 Harlem Stories: The Music of Thelonious Monk (WJ3 Records, 2020)

References

1973 births
Living people
American jazz tenor saxophonists
Jazz musicians from California
GRP Records artists
Impulse! Records artists
People from Fairfield, California